The Laoag Airport Road, also known as Airport Avenue, Airport Access Road, and Airport Road, is a national secondary road that connects the Manila North Road to Laoag International Airport.

The entire road is designated as National Route 100 (N100) of the Philippine highway network.

Intersections

References 

Roads in Ilocos Norte